Botswana has produced postage stamps for national use since becoming independent on 30 September 1966. The country formerly used the stamps of the Bechuanaland Protectorate. The first independence issue of 1966 included depictions of an abattoir in Lobatse, Botswana National Airways and the State House in Gaborone.

Philatelic Museum
Botswana Post have established a small philatelic museum in their headquarters in Gaborone.

See also
Postage stamps and postal history of Bechuanaland Protectorate
List of people on the postage stamps of Botswana

References

External links 
Catalogue of Botswana meter marks.
Philately at Botswana Post.
Botswana stamps

Communications in Botswana
Philately of Botswana